The 2015 Campeonato Brasiliense de Futebol was the 40th edition of the Distrito Federal's top professional football league. The competition began on 25 January and ended on 2 May. Gama won the championship for the 11th time.

First stage

Final stage

Finals

Gama won 4–0 on aggregate.

References 

Distrito Federal
Campeonato Brasiliense